Right. Rev Vicentia Refiloe Kgabe is an Anglican Bishop of Diocese of Lesotho in the Anglican Church of South Africa and academic teaching Practical Theology.

Early life and education 

Born in Soweto, Kgabe attended schools in Soweto, she started her theological training at the College of the Transfiguration. She undertook further theological studies at the University of Pretoria where she obtained a PhD in Practical Theology in 2011. She has also attended Pretoria University's Gordon Institute of Business Science (GIBS) leadership programme.

Clerical career 

Kgabe was made deacon in 2002 and was ordained as a priest in 2003. She served as rector of the Parish of Weltevreden St Michael and All Angels, a position she has held since 2013. She has, however, served in parishes around the Diocese of Johannesburg since her ordination. She was an archdeacon in the Diocese of Johannesburg, where she has had responsibility for the promotion and discernment of vocations to the ordained ministry of the church.

In 2014 she was appointed rector of the College of the Transfiguration.

In 2021 she was elected as bishop of Lesotho.

Other work 

Member of the board for Hope Africa and of the council of the College of the Transfiguration.

Publications

Notes and references 

 

 

 

21st-century Anglican Church of Southern Africa bishops
Living people
Year of birth missing (living people)
Women Anglican clergy
College of the Transfiguration alumni
Academic staff of the College of the Transfiguration
Anglican bishops of Lesotho
University of Pretoria alumni